Christopher Michael Barrios Jr. (January 2, 2001 – March 8, 2007) was a six-year-old American boy who was raped and murdered in Brunswick, Georgia, on March 8, 2007. His body was discovered on March 15, 2007, just a few miles from where he disappeared.

Arrest
George, David, and Peggy Edenfield were all accused of Barrios' abduction and murder. A fourth person, Donald Dale, originally charged with tampering with evidence and concealing a body, has since pleaded guilty to a lesser charge of lying to police. Superior Court Judge Stephen Scarlett accepted the plea and transferred Dale to a mental-health facility, and banished him from Glynn County. Peggy Edenfield testified in the case against her husband David and agreed to testify against her son George during his trial. In exchange for her testimony, Peggy avoided the death penalty; she was eventually sentenced to sixty years in prison.

David Edenfield murder trial
The trial of David Homer Edenfield (born June 4, 1948) began on September 29, 2009, and ended on October 5, 2009. The prosecution relied heavily on Edenfield's videotaped confession and his wife's testimony. Dr. Jamie Downs, the medical examiner who performed Christopher's autopsy, also testified to the extent of trauma found on the body and also the manner of death, which Edenfield's taped confession corroborated. Closing arguments began on the fifth day and the jury was sent to deliberate that afternoon. On October 5, with only two hours of deliberation, the jury returned with a verdict of "guilty on all counts." On October 6, David Edenfield was sentenced to death.

George Edenfield's competency
On August 3, 2010, George Edenfield was ruled mentally incompetent to stand trial and was committed to a state mental hospital for evaluation. It will be the determination of psychologists and other mental health experts whether or not Edenfield will have a strong likelihood of becoming competent.

Prior assaults
David Edenfield was charged in 1994 with committing incest with his daughter and pleaded guilty. He was sentenced to ten years probation.

George Edenfield was convicted of two counts of child molestation and given probation in May 1997. On March 5, 2007, days before Christopher was abducted, Edenfield was sentenced to ten years probation.

A state law banning convicted sex offenders from living within a thousand feet of parks, playgrounds, child-care facilities, schools, churches, swimming pools, and school bus stops was passed in 2006; however, the school bus stop provision was blocked by a federal judge pending his decision in a suit claiming this provision to be unconstitutional.

Soap opera photo
In October 2008,  a photograph of Barrios appeared in an episode of General Hospital: Night Shift on Soapnet. In the episode, actor Billy Dee Williams receives a letter and photo from a son he abandoned. The show's producers have stated they are unsure how they got the photo and offered an apology. They promised to air a series of public service announcements in the child's honor. The Barrios family filed a civil suit against the SOAPnet, which airs the soap opera, claiming invasion of privacy.

See also
Child sexual abuse
Jessica Lunsford Act
List of death row inmates in the United States

References

External links
 Profile, msnbc.msn.com
 Memorial site (1)
 Memorial site (2)

2000s missing person cases
2007 in Georgia (U.S. state)
2007 murders in the United States
Deaths by person in Georgia (U.S. state)
Formerly missing people
Incidents of violence against boys
Male murder victims
Missing person cases in Georgia (U.S. state)
Murdered American children
People from Brunswick, Georgia
People murdered in Georgia (U.S. state)
Rapes in the United States
Violence against men in North America